Joe Kort (born 1963) is an American psychotherapist, clinical social worker, board-certified clinical sexologist, author, lecturer and facilitator of therapeutic workshops. He works as Clinical Director and founder of The Center for Relationship and Sexual Health in Royal Oak, Michigan. Kort also was appointed co-director of Modern Sex Therapy Institutes providing Sex Therapy Certifications and a Ph.D. in Clinical Sexology.

Kort established his private practice in 1985m specializing in LGBTQIA Affirmative Therapy, mixed-orientation marriages and relationships, male sexual fluidity issues, sexual addiction, sexual abuse, and Imago Relationship Therapy.

His work also focuses on out-of-control sexual behaviors (OCSB)/sex addiction, Relationship Problems and Marital Conflict, Sex Therapy, and Sexual Identity Concerns, Depression, Anxiety and Post Traumatic Stress Disorder. He also is trained in EMDR (Eye Movement Desensitization Reprocessing).

He is the author of four books and numerous journal and magazine articles. He is also the host of “Smart Sex, Smart Love,” a podcast series (www.smartsexsmartlove.com).

His practice is located in Royal Oak, Michigan. He works with clients from all over the Metro Detroit area. Kort also conducts long-distance coaching and consultation.

Education 
Kort obtained his undergraduate degree from Michigan State University in East Lansing, Michigan, with a dual major in psychology and social work. He earned master’s degrees in social work and psychology from Wayne State University in Detroit, Michigan, and a doctorate (PhD) in Clinical Sexology from the American Academy of Clinical Sexologists.

Career
Kort is the founder and clinical director of The Center for Relationship and Sexual Health in Royal Oak, Michigan, and the co-director of Modern Sex Therapy Institutes. Kort specializes in marital problems and conflicts; mixed orientation marriages; male sexuality and sexual health concerns; “sex addiction,” out-of-control sexual behaviors; sexual identity issues; childhood sexual abuse; LGBTQIA Affirmative Therapy; and Imago Relationship Therapy.

Kort was a part of the teaching faculty at University of Michigan Sexual Health Certificate Program on LGBT issues from 2014-2019.

Media
Kort was a featured guest on The Montel Williams Show''''  and The Tyra Banks Show talk shows on the topic of mixed-orientation marriages. Kort was also a guest on Oprah and Friends Radio "Better in Bed" with Laura Berman, discussing straight men who have sex with men.

Activism
Kort's career focuses on advancing the social acceptance, and professional treatment of the gay, lesbian, bisexual and transgender communities. His first book, 10 Smart Things Gay Men Can Do to Improve Their Lives (2003, Alyson Books) gave answers to the most common questions his clients brought to him. Kort came out with a second edition in 2016. This book has been updated and revised and includes a new chapter on the sexual health of gay men which replaces the chapter on sexual addiction. The old Chapter 5, "Avoid or Overcome Sexual Addiction," has been replaced by "Explore Erotic Turn-ons and Sexual Interests." It also reflects the contemporary culture of gay men in social media, marriage equality and updated information on HIV.

Kort advocates for men who have sex with men (MSM), particularly heterosexual men who engage in sexual behavior with other men and are not gay or bisexual. The term "down low" specifically addresses African-American males secretly engaging in sexual behavior with other men. Kort has expanded the awareness of down-low behavior to apply beyond men of color and writes about this sexual behavior crossing all ethnicities, races, religions and socioeconomics.

While many gay men consider themselves either top, bottom and versatile, the term side has been proposed and coined by Joe Kort for gay men who are not interested in anal sex.

Personal life
Kort met his partner, Mike, in 1993, and they religiously married under Reform Judaism in 2000 and legally married in 2005 in Massachusetts. The New York Times quoted him as saying, "For many young gay men today, settling down in a relationship in their 20s—or getting married if they live in Massachusetts—will feel like a very natural thing to do."

In addition to identifying as gay, Kort also identifies as "homoflexible", stating that "as I get older, I find myself noticing women in sexual ways more than I ever have before." Kort is Jewish.

Publications
10 Smart Things Gay Men Can Do to Improve Their Lives
10 Smart Things Gay Men Can Do to Improve Their Lives; Second edition
10 Smart Things Gay Men Can Do to Find Real Love
Gay Affirmative Psychotherapy for the Straight Clinician
Is My Husband Straight, Gay, or Bi? (: Rowman & Littlefield Publishers, 2014.)
"Sexual aftereffects in male survivors of childhood sexual abuse: orientation confusion, compulsions, kinky sexual interests, and dysfunctions" a chapter in Understanding the Sexual Betrayal of Boys and Men: The Trauma of Sexual Abuse
LGBTQ Clients in Therapy: Clinical Issues and Treatment Strategies(: W. W. Norton & Company; 1 edition (February 20, 2018))
Erotic Orientation: Helping Couples and Individuals Understand Their Sexual Lives
Cracking the Erotic Code: Helping Gay Men Understand Their Sexual Fantasies
LGBTQ Clients in Therapy: Clinical Issues and Treatment Strategies
Understanding the Sexual Betrayal of Boys and Men (Psychoanalysis in a New Key Book Series)

References

External links

Modern Sex Therapy Institutes

American self-help writers
American gay writers
20th-century American Jews
American social workers
Living people
1963 births
21st-century American Jews